Joseph Francis Smith (January 24, 1920 – May 14, 1999), was an American politician from Pennsylvania who served as a Democratic member of the United States House of Representatives for Pennsylvania's 3rd congressional district from 1981 to 1983.  He served as Chairman of the Philadelphia Democratic City Committee from 1983 to 1986 and as a member of the Pennsylvania State Senate for the 4th district from 1971 to 1981.

Early life and education
Smith was born in Philadelphia, Pennsylvania and attended St. Anne's Parochial School.  He graduated from Northeast Catholic High School in Philadelphia in 1939.  He attended St. Joseph's College in Philadelphia from 1940 to 1942.  Smith was a sergeant and Purple Heart recipient in the United States Army during World War II from 1942 to 1945.

Career
After leaving the military, Smith became active in local politics, serving first as Ward Chair for James A. Byrne between 1965 and 1970. He became Byrne's Administrative Assistant during that time. He then served in the Pennsylvania State Senate from 1971 until 1981, and eventually became Chairman of the Committee on Appropriations.

He won election in 1981 as a Democrat to the 97th Congress through a special election to fill the vacancy caused by the resignation of United States Representative Raymond Lederer due to the ABSCAM sting. Smith lost the Democratic primary in the special election to David B. Glancey, but then ran as a Republican, with the blessing of the GOP, in the general election and won. He promised during his campaign that he would caucus with the Democrats if elected.

After redistricting in 1982, Smith narrowly lost the Democratic primary against fellow congressman Tom Foglietta. He went on to become Democratic City Chairman in Philadelphia between 1983 and 1986. Smith also served as the 31st Ward Leader for more than three decades.

He died in Philadelphia and is interred at the Most Holy Redeemer Cemetery in Philadelphia.

Legacy
In honor of Smith's years of service to his community, the United States Postal Service facility located at 1602 Frankford Avenue in Philadelphia ("Kensington Station") was renamed as the Joseph F. Smith Post Office Building.

Personal life
He was married to Regina Bukowski-Smith, also of the Port Richmond section in Philadelphia.  They had one daughter, Regina.

References

 H.R.4554: To redesignate the facility of the United States Postal Service located at 1602 Frankford Avenue in Philadelphia, Pennsylvania, as the "Joseph F. Smith Post Office Building". Sponsor: Rep Robert A. Borski. Introduced May 25, 2000; July 18, 2000, considered and passed House; October 6, 2000, considered and passed U.S. Senate.

1920 births
1999 deaths
United States Army personnel of World War II
United States Army soldiers
Democratic Party Pennsylvania state senators
Democratic Party members of the United States House of Representatives from Pennsylvania
Politicians from Philadelphia
Military personnel from Philadelphia
20th-century American politicians